Crazy Kind of Love is a 2013 American romantic comedy-drama film directed by Sarah Siegel-Magness which is based on  the 1995 novel Angel Angel by April Stevens. The film stars Virginia Madsen, Graham Rogers, Amanda Crew, Zach Gilford and Sam Trammell in lead roles and was released on May 31, 2013.

Plot 
Depressed after getting dumped by her cheating husband, Augusta recovers from a resulting nervous breakdown by way of observing her two sons, 18-year-old Henry and older brother Matthew, as they come of age.

Cast 
 Virginia Madsen as Augusta Iris
 Graham Rogers as Henry Iris
 Amanda Crew as Bette Mack
 Zach Gilford as Matthew Iris
 Sam Trammell as Jeff Lucas
 Madeline Zima as Annie Miller
 Kristoffer Ryan Winters as Dave
 Anthony LaPaglia as Gordie
 Aly Michalka as Janine Bosh
 Lin Shaye as Denise Mack
 Christopher Atkins as Mr. Jeffries

Production and casting 
The original working title was Long Time Gone.  Meg Ryan was originally attached to the role of Augusta, but bowed out and was replaced by Virginia Madsen in September 2011.

This was the directorial debut for Sarah Siegel-Magness, who had been producer on three films, including Precious (2009), prior to joining this film. Karen McCullah wrote the screenplay after optioning the book. On June 16, 2011, Variety reported that newcomer Graham Rogers joined the adaptation playing a teen son. Seth Jaret, Bobbi Sue Luther and Gary Magness  produced the film. True Blood actor Sam Trammell also joined the cast. In early July 2011, Zach Gilford, Madeline Zima and Aly Michalka were signed to the film.

References

External links
 
 
 
 

2013 films
American romantic comedy-drama films
2013 romantic comedy-drama films
Films set in Los Angeles
Phase 4 Films films
Films based on American novels
Films scored by Mario Grigorov
2010s English-language films
2010s American films